The upper plains unit is the remnants of a 50-100 meter thick mantling that has been discovered in the mid-latitudes of the planet Mars.  It was first investigated in the Deuteronilus Mensae (Ismenius Lacus quadrangle) region, but it occurs in other places as well.  The remnants consist of sets of dipping layers in impact craters, in depressions,  and along mesas. Sets of dipping layers may be of various sizes and shapes—some look like Aztec pyramids from Central America.

This unit also degrades into brain terrain.  Brain terrain is a region of maze-like ridges 3–5 meters high.  Some ridges may consist of an ice core, so they may be sources of water for future colonists.

Some regions of the upper plains unit display large fractures and troughs with raised rims; such regions are called ribbed upper plains.  Fractures are believed to have started with small cracks from stresses.  Stress is suggested to initiate the fracture process since ribbed upper plains are common when debris aprons come together or near the edge of debris aprons—such sites would generate compressional stresses.  Cracks exposed more surfaces, and consequently more ice in the material sublimates into the planet’s thin atmosphere.  Eventually, small cracks become large canyons or troughs.

Small cracks often contain small pits and chains of pits; these are thought to be from sublimation of ice in the ground.
Large areas of the Martian surface are loaded with ice that is protected by a meters thick layer of dust and other material.  However, if cracks appear, a fresh surface will expose ice to the thin atmosphere.  In a short time, the ice will disappear into the cold, thin atmosphere in a process called sublimation.  Dry ice behaves in a similar fashion on the Earth.  On Mars sublimation has been observed when the Phoenix lander uncovered chunks of ice that disappeared in a few days.  In addition, HiRISE has seen fresh craters with ice at the bottom.  After a time, HiRISE saw the ice deposit disappear.

The upper plains unit is thought to have fallen from the sky.  It drapes various surfaces, as if it fell evenly.  As is the case for other mantle deposits, the upper plains unit has layers, is fine-grained, and is ice-rich.   It is widespread; it does not seem to have a point source.  The surface appearance of some regions of Mars is due to how this unit has degraded.  It is a major cause of the surface appearance of lobate debris aprons.
The layering of the upper plains mantling unit and other mantling units are believed to be caused by major changes in the planet’s climate.  Models predict that the obliquity or tilt of the rotational axis has varied from its present 25 degrees to maybe over 80 degrees over geological time.  Periods of high tilt will cause the ice in the polar caps to be redistributed and change the amount of dust in the atmosphere.

See also
 Brain terrain
 Climate of Mars
 Geology of Mars
 Ismenius Lacus quadrangle
 Hellas quadrangle
 Lobate debris apron 
 Pedestal crater
 Phoenix (spacecraft)

References

Surface features of Mars